Arijana Gigliani (born 27 February 1979) is a Croatian-Bosnian opera singer (dramatic soprano). Her voice is known for its power and extension, usable in many operatic roles.

Early life

Arijana Marić Gigliani was born 27 February 1979 in Sarajevo, SR Bosnia and Herzegovina, SFR Yugoslavia. She received her primary musical education in Sarajevo. Her first operatic appearance in front of an audience was during the 1987-1988 season of the Sarajevo National Theatre, where she played Hugh Crome in the children's opera The Little Sweep, by Benjamin Britten. In the 1990-1991 season, Gigliani performed in the children's choir in a Serbo-Croatian version of Carmen.

Gigliani attended a musical high school in Sarajevo, where she played violin and graduated in 1997. During the Bosnian War, she played violin as an associate player with the Sarajevo Philharmonic Orchestra. In 1998, she moved to Zagreb, Croatia to study operatic solo singing under Croatian opera soprano Lidija Horvat Dunjko. In 2005, she graduated from the Music Academy of Zagreb with a master's degree in music. Since then, she has continued to train professionally with Bulgarian operatic tenor Stojan Stojanov Gančev.

Professional career
Gigliani made her professional debut in May 2005 at the Sarajevo National Theatre, in the role of Jelena in Nikola Šubić Zrinski, by Ivan Zajc. Her subsequent work has included a dozen solo performances in Croatia and abroad, such as in Austria, Germany, and the Czech Republic. She also performed solo concerts with the Sarajevo Philharmonic Orchestra and Dubrovnik Symphonic Orchestra.

Her roles have included Lady Macbeth in Giuseppe Verdi's Macbeth, Berta in The Barber of Seville, by Gioachino Rossini, and Abigaille in Verdi's Nabucco.

Teaching career
Gigliani has also taught singers in secondary education and college. From 2008 to 2011, she won a dozen domestic and international awards with her students.

Awards
International Opera Competition 2008 in Belgrade, Serbia: 1st class award
International Opera Competition 2010 in Herceg Novi, Montenegro: 1st class award

References

1979 births
Croatian educators
Croatian women educators
Croatian operatic sopranos
Living people
Operatic mezzo-sopranos
Voice teachers
21st-century Croatian women singers
Women music educators